Santo Virgilio Biasatti  (b. December 6, 1943) is an Argentine journalist. He has worked in both television and radio, and received the Golden Martín Fierro Award in 1996.

References

Argentine journalists
Male journalists
Golden Martín Fierro Award winners
People from Buenos Aires
1943 births
Living people